Sensory analysis (or sensory evaluation) is a scientific discipline that applies principles of experimental design and statistical analysis to the use of human senses (sight, smell, taste, touch and hearing) for the purposes of evaluating consumer products. The discipline requires panels of human assessors, on whom the products are tested, and recording the responses made by them. By applying statistical techniques to the results it is possible to make inferences and insights about the products under test. Most large consumer goods companies have departments dedicated to sensory analysis. 
Sensory analysis can mainly be broken down into three sub-sections:
 Analytical testing (dealing with objective facts about products)
 Affective testing (dealing with subjective facts such as preferences)
 Perception (the biochemical and psychological aspects of sensation)

Analytical testing 
This type of testing is concerned with obtaining objective facts about products. This could range from basic discrimination testing (e.g. Do two or more products differ from each other?) to descriptive analysis (e.g. What are the characteristics of two or more products?). The type of panel required for this type of testing would normally be a trained panel.

There are several types of sensory tests. The most classic is the sensory profile. In this test, each taster describes each product by means of a questionnaire. The questionnaire includes a list of descriptors (e.g., bitterness, acidity, etc.). The taster rates each descriptor for each product depending on the intensity of the descriptor he perceives in the product (e.g., 0 = very weak to 10 = very strong). In the method of Free choice profiling, each taster builds his own questionnaire.

Another family of methods is known as holistic as they are focused on the overall appearance of the product. This is the case of the categorization and the napping.

Affective testing 
Also known as consumer testing, this type of testing is concerned with obtaining subjective data, or how well products are likely to be accepted. Usually large (50 or more) panels of untrained personnel are recruited for this type of testing, although smaller focus groups can be utilised to gain insights into products. The range of testing can vary from simple comparative testing (e.g. Which do you prefer, A or B?) to structured questioning regarding the magnitude of acceptance of individual characteristics (e.g. Please rate the "fruity aroma": dislike|neither|like).

See also
European Sensory Network
Food Quality and Preference
Journal of Sensory Studies
Pangborn Sensory Science Symposium

Notes and references

Bibliography 
 ASTM  MNL14 The Role of Sensory Analysis in Quality Control, 1992
 ISO 16820  Sensory Analysis - Methodology - Sequential Analysis
 ISO 5495   Sensory Analysis - Methodology - Paired Comparisons
 ISO 13302  Sensory Analysis - Methods for assessing modifications to the flavour of foodstuffs due to packaging
 Sensory Evaluation Techniques- Morten C. Meilgaard, Gail Vance Civille, B. Thomas Carr - 4th edition, 2007

External links 
 ISO 67.240 - Sensory analysis - A series of ISO standards
 Sensory evaluation practice; Herbert Stone, Joel L. Sidel

Product testing
Psychophysics